"Miami" is a song by American rapper and actor Will Smith from his debut solo album, Big Willie Style (1997). It samples the Whispers's 1979 single "And the Beat Goes On". Released as a single on November 23, 1998, the song charted at number 17 on the  Billboard Hot 100 and number three on the UK Singles Chart.

"Miami" won a MTV VMA Best Male Video award. The video, which incorporates the first two verses and refrains of the selection's "radio edit" followed by the third verse and refrain of its "Miami Mix", features an early on-screen appearance of Smith's future Hitch co-star, Eva Mendes.

Critical reception
Larry Flick of Billboard wrote, "Smith should have no problem maintaining the momentum of his current album, "Big Willie Style", with this third single, following the ubiquitous "Gettin' Jiggy Wit It" and "Just The Two Of Us". On "Miami", he talks us up with an ode to the heat, style, and hip factor of that city. This time around, Smith employs the instrumental hook of the Whispers' 1979 single "And The Beat Goes On", which adds a classic, string-filled disco backdrop as festive as the city itself. With Smith's record on the airwaves and at the box office, as well as his appeal with younger demographics, this really is a no-brainer, now isn't it?"

Music video
In the music video for the song, Smith and members of his band are freezing in Philadelphia, where it is 30 degrees below zero causing a bandmate to curse Jack Frost. They hop on a plane to Miami, and are shown going around Miami in their car and various scenes morph into one another. The video ends with Will Smith and his band performing a concert. The video features samples from Gloria Estefan's hits "Conga" and "You'll Be Mine (Party Time)".

Track listings

UK CD1
 "Miami" (radio edit) – 3:19
 "Miami" (Miami Mix) – 4:40
 "Miami" (Jason Nevins "Live on South Beach Dub") – 5:10

UK CD2
 "Miami" (radio edit) – 3:19
 "Just The Two of Us" (Rodney Jerkins Remix) – 4:14
 "Just Cruisin'" (Trackmasters Remix) – 4:11

UK cassette single and European CD single
 "Miami" (radio edit) – 3:19
 "Miami" (Miami Mix) – 4:40

Australian CD single
 "Miami" (radio edit) – 3:19
 "Miami" (Jason Nevins Live at "54" Mix) – 5:57
 "Miami" (Miami Mix) – 4:40
 "Miami" (Jason Nevins "Live on South Beach Dub") – 5:10

Charts

Weekly charts

Year-end charts

Sales and certifications

Release history

References

Will Smith songs
1998 singles
Columbia Records singles
MTV Video Music Award for Best Male Video
Music videos directed by Wayne Isham
Songs about Florida
Songs written by Leon Sylvers III
Songs written by Ryan Toby
Songs written by Will Smith